In aviation, vertical navigation (VNAV, usually pronounced vee-nav) is glidepath information provided during an instrument approach, independently of ground-based navigation aids.  An onboard  navigation system displays a constant rate descent path to minimums.  The VNAV path is computed using aircraft performance, approach constraints, weather data, and aircraft weight.  The approach path is computed from the top of descent point to the end of descent waypoint, which is typically the runway or missed approach point.

Overview
A flight management system (FMS) uses either a performance or a geometric VNAV path.  The performance path is computed from the top of the descent to the first constrained waypoint, using idle or near idle power.  This is referred to as an idle descent path at ECON speed.  The geometric path is shallower descent and typically not at idle.  The geometric path uses an assigned vertical angle or the computed point to point path between constrained waypoints. 

RNAV approaches combine VNAV navigation equipment with LNAV navigation equipment to provide both lateral and vertical approach guidance. Vertical guidance comes from WAAS GPS or a barometric VNAV (Baro-VNAV) system.  The FMS provides flight control steering and thrust guidance along the VNAV path.  

VNAV information on an approach plate includes the Final Approach Fix (FAF), the FAF crossing altitude, a Vertical Descent Angle (VDA), the landing runway threshold as a second fix, the Threshold Crossing Height (TCH), and perhaps a Visual Descent Point (VDP).  A pilot uses the VDA, and ground speed, to compute a rate of descent (from a table found in the U.S. Terminal Procedures Publication), which is flown using the Vertical velocity indicator.

Aircraft approved for LNAV/VNAV minimums include the Boeing 737NG, 767, 777, the Airbus A300 and some ATRs.

Baro-VNAV
A Baro-VNAV is an RNAV system which uses the aircraft altimeter to compute and display a vertical guidance path.  The path is either geometric between two waypoints, or based on an angle from a single waypoint.  Baro-VNAV procedures include a minimum and maximum temperature limitation.  Otherwise, temperature compensations must be used.

References

External links

Air navigation